Out West with the Hardys is a 1938 American comedy film directed by George B. Seitz and the fifth film in the Andy Hardy series of sixteen films.

Premise
Judge Hardy gets a request to help out an old friend so he takes his family on a holiday out west when a friend has legal difficulties over water rights.

Cast

References

External links

 Out West with the Hardys at IMDb
 
 Out West with the Hardys at TCMDB
 
 Out West with the Hardys at Andy Hardy Films
 

1938 films
1938 comedy films
American comedy films
American black-and-white films
Films directed by George B. Seitz
Metro-Goldwyn-Mayer films
Films with screenplays by William Ludwig
1930s English-language films
1930s American films